Oretachi no Celebration (俺たちのセレブレーション) is the fortieth single by the Japanese pop-rock band Porno Graffitti. It was released on September 3, 2014.

Track listing

References

2014 singles
Porno Graffitti songs
SME Records singles